This is a list of international presidential trips made by Mauricio Macri, the 53rd President of Argentina. During his presidency, Mauricio Macri visited 20 countries as of May 2017.

Summary of international trips

2015
The following international trips were made by President Mauricio Macri in 2015:

2016
The following international trips were made by President Mauricio Macri in 2016:

2017

2018

2019

References

Presidency of Mauricio Macri
Lists of 21st-century trips
Macri, Mauricio
Macri, Mauricio
Macri
Macri, Mauricio